Bhavana Bhatt is an Indian actress who has worked in Hindi and Punjabi films.

Bhatt started her career in the Hindi film Do Jasoos, where she worked with famous actors such as Raj Kapoor and Rajendra Kumar. Later she acted opposite Raj Kapoor's son in Naya Daur in 1978. She also appeared in many Punjabi films including Sassi Punnu, Jatt Punjabi, Rano, Jeeja Saali, Chamak Challo, and Maujan Dubai Diyan. Most of her Punjabi films were opposite actor Satish Kaul.

Filmography
 Jai Maa Karwa Chauth (1994)
 Jeeja Sali (1985)
 Maujaan Dubai Diyaan (1985)
 Bagga Daku (1983)
 Chhammak Chhallo (1982)
 Nek Parveen (1982)
 Raano (1981)
 Patita (1980)
 Jatt Punjabi (1979)
 Naya Daur (1978)
 Lachhi (1977) Punjabi Movie 
 Phir Janam Lenge Hum (1977)
 Do Jasoos (1975) (as Bhavna Bhatt) ... Pinky Verma.

References

External links
 

Actresses in Punjabi cinema
Living people
Indian film actresses
20th-century Indian actresses
Year of birth missing (living people)